The Model School, Abu Dhabi is situated in Musaffah, Abu Dhabi, in the United Arab Emirates.  The school follows the Indian CBSE Syllabus till Std.VII while CBSE and Kerala Syllabus from Std.VIII to XII.

Facilities of the school include laboratories for physics, chemistry, and biology, a library, a basketball ground, volleyball court, cricket pitch and a football ground.

Abu Dhabi Model School is a conglomerate of New Indian Model School.

Curriculum and programs
Academic year of the school commences on 1 April and ends on 31 March of the following year. The school remains closed for summer vacation for approximately two months i.e. July and August.

The school has classes from K.G to 12 std. Subjects taught include:

 L.K.G & U.K.G: English, Modern Mathematics, General Knowledge, Drawing, Islamic Education/Quran/ Moral Science.
Std.1 to 7: English, Hindi, Malayalam/Urdu/Tamil/Bengali, Arabic, Modern Mathematics, General Science, Social Studies, Drawing, Islamic Education/Quran/Moral Science.
Std 8 to 10: English, Malayalam/Additional English or Special English, Hindi, Physics, Chemistry, Biology, Social science and Mathematics. Arabic is compulsory for std. 8).
 Higher Secondary Science Stream: English, Hindi, Physics, chemistry, Biology, Mathematics.
 Higher Secondary Commerce Stream: English, Hindi, Business studies, accountancy, Economics, computer applications.

Islamic Education is compulsory for Muslim children. Minimum 50% marks are required for passing in Islamic education examination. Arabic and Social studies are compulsory subjects as per the regulations of the Ministry of education. Minimum 50% marks are required to pass in Arabic and 40% in Social studies.

Islamic environment

Abu Dhabi Model School provides an Islamic environment, and encourages students from Pakistan and Bangladesh to join the school. The presence of Arab students are rare, however a few could be spotted coming from migrant families during the 1990s. The breaks at school are designed in such a way as to complete the five daily prayers. Teachers encourage the students to attend school Mosque.

School Mosque

Students have the opportunity to learn Quran during their studies. Some of them would take breaks from regular studies to memorise the Qur'an and would later join back. Imams present in the mosque are well versed in Qur'an recitation. During Thursdays there would be a short talk in the Mosque, encouraging Muslim students to spend more time to learn and preach the religion. After the daily afternoon prayer there would be a short reading from the books of Hadith.

Sports

The school has facilities for basketball, volleyball and football. Students are given quality training to perform well in inter-school tournaments. A sizable number of students engage in cricket during breaks.

References

External links
 New Indian Model School, Dubai
   The Central School, Dubai
    New Indian Model School, Al Ain
   New Indian Model School, Sharjah
 The Oxford School, Calicut
 The Oxford School, Kollam
 The Oxford School, Trivandrum

Schools in the Emirate of Abu Dhabi
1987 establishments in the United Arab Emirates